Richard Moritz Buhlig (December 21, 1880 – January 30, 1952) was an American pianist.

Buhlig was born in Chicago to a German immigrant father from Saxony, the baker Moritz Buhlig, and his wife Louise. He received early lessons from August Hyllested, Wilhelm Middelschulte and Margaret Cameron, who had studied with the legendary Teodor Leszetycki. In 1897, 16-year-old Buhlig moved to Vienna to study with Teodor Leszetycki himself. Upon completing his studies in 1900, he gave his first public concert in 1901 in Berlin, and toured extensively in Europe until late 1906. He lived in Berlin until May 1916, where he tutored pupils privately, among others Grete Sultan and Grete Trakl, the sister of the Austrian poet Georg Trakl.

In 1907 Buhlig made his first mature American debut, with the Philadelphia Orchestra in New York City. In 1918 Buhlig joined the staff of the Juilliard School (then called "Institute of Musical Art") in New York as a piano teacher: he gave recitals of Beethoven, Brahms, Chopin, Schubert and Schumann (with emphasis on Beethoven). However, he soon left the position and went to Europe again. Some years later he returned to the US and settled in Los Angeles, dividing his time between teaching and performing. He died in Los Angeles.

As a pianist, Buhlig was highly regarded for his performances of Bach (particularly the two piano transcription of The Art of Fugue he made and performed), late Beethoven and Brahms. However, much of his repertoire was contemporary or near-contemporary music. He gave the American premiere of Arnold Schoenberg's Op. 11 and performed pieces by other European modernists such as Ferruccio Busoni, Béla Bartók, Zoltán Kodály and Claude Debussy. He also played music by new composers: Ruth Crawford and Adolf Weiss among others. In the 1920s he began playing Henry Cowell (whom he also taught) and his circle. In early 1930s Buhlig tutored John Cage: it was he who advised Cage to study with Schoenberg. The German pianist Grete Sultan, mentor to Christian Wolff and friend to Cage (whom she had met in 1946 through Buhlig), had studied under Buhlig in early 1900s - they became lifelong friends.

Notes

References
 Bax, Marty: Immer zu wenig Liebe. Grete Trakl. Ihr feinster Kuppler. Ihre Familie. Amsterdam 2014, E-Book .
 Bredow, Moritz von. 2012. "Rebellische Pianistin. Das Leben der Grete Sultan zwischen Berlin und New York." (Biography). Schott Music, Mainz, Germany. 
 
 Olmstead, Andrea. 1999. Juilliard: A History. University of Illinois Press. 
 Tick, Judith. 1997. Ruth Crawford Seeger: A Composer's Search for American Music. Oxford University Press US.

External links
 

1880 births
1952 deaths
20th-century classical pianists
20th-century American pianists
20th-century American male musicians
Contemporary classical music performers
American classical pianists
American male classical pianists
Classical musicians from Illinois
Musicians from Chicago
Educators from Illinois
Juilliard School faculty